"Steamboat ladies" was a nickname given to a number of female students at the women's colleges of the universities of Oxford and Cambridge who were awarded ad eundem University of Dublin degrees at Trinity College Dublin, between 1904 and 1907, at a time when their own universities refused to confer degrees upon women. The name comes from the means of transport commonly used by these women to travel to Dublin for this purpose.

Trinity admitted female students in 1904. Unlike Oxford and Cambridge, where women had for some years been admitted to separate female colleges within the overall university, both men and women were admitted to the University of Dublin's only college (Trinity) and it was felt there would be no rationale to restrict successful female students from graduating to become members of the university like their male counterparts. In accordance with the long-standing formula of ad eundem mutual recognition that existed between Dublin, Oxford and Cambridge, Anthony Traill, the then-Provost of Trinity College, proposed that eligible female Oxbridge course completers be granted Trinity degrees, as was the case for men.  The policy lasted from June 1904 to December 1907, when requirements for ad eundem awards were revised.

The Board of Trinity College thought that only small numbers of women would take up the offer to graduate and that they would be Irish women who had studied in Oxford or Cambridge colleges. In fact, by 1907 Trinity had granted degrees to some 720 "steamboat ladies".[3] All had passed examinations at Oxbridge that would have earned them a degree if they were male.[3] The women were predominantly students of Girton and Newnham Colleges, Cambridge and Somerville College, Oxford.[2]

Money derived from the degree conferral fees that female graduates paid during this period was largely ring-fenced and was used to fund the purchase of Trinity Hall, an extramural hall of residence for female students, which opened in 1908.

Notable steamboat ladies
 Julia Bell (1879–1979), human geneticist
 Dorothy Brock DBE (1886–1969), educationist and headmistress
 Sara Burstall (1859–1939), educationist and headmistress
 Frances Dove DBE, JP (1847–1942), teacher and headmistress
 Gertrude Elles MBE (1872–1960), geologist
 Lilian Faithfull CBE, JP (1865–1952), teacher and headmistress
 Philippa Fawcett (1868–1948), mathematician and educationalist
 Florence Gadesen (1853–1934), teacher and headmistress
 Ethel Gavin (1866–1918), educationist and headmistress
 Frances Ralph Gray (1861–1935), teacher and headmistress
Hilda Phoebe Hudson (1881–1965) mathematician who worked on algebraic geometry, in particular on Cremona transformations.
 Ruth Herbert Lewis (1871-1946), social reformer and folk-song collector
 Katharine Jex-Blake (1860–1951), classicist and teacher
 Lilian Knowles (1870–1926), historian and professor of economic history
 Penelope Lawrence (1856–1932), educator
 Ellen McArthur (1862–1927), economic historian
 Edith Major (1867–1951), educationist and headmistress
 Emily Penrose DBE (1858–1942), classicist and educationalist
 Bertha Phillpotts DBE (1877–1932), linguist, historian and educationalist
 Eleanor Rathbone (1872–1946), suffragist, social reformer and member of parliament
 Shena Simon (1883–1972), politician, feminist, educationalist and writer
 Eugénie Sellers Strong CBE (1860–1943), archaeologist and art historian
 Margaret Tuke (1862–1947), academic and educator
 Katharine Wallas CBE (1864–1944), politician and educationalist
 Mary Hay Wood (1868–1934), educationist

References

Sources
 .
 .
 
Susan M. Parkes, « Trinity College, Dublin and the “Steamboat Ladies”, 1904–1907 », in Mary R. Masson & Deborah Simonton, Women and higher education: past, present and future, Aberdeen University Press, 1996, 352 p. (ISBN 1857522605), p. 244–250.
 

1904 in England
1904 in Ireland 
1905 in England
1905 in Ireland 
1906 in England
1906 in Ireland 
History of education in England
History of the University of Oxford
History of the University of Cambridge
Lists of people associated with the University of Oxford
Lists of people associated with the University of Cambridge
Oxbridge
Terminology of the University of Cambridge
Trinity College Dublin-related lists
University of Dublin
History of education in Ireland
People associated with Somerville College, Oxford